German Type UE submarine may refer to:

 German Type UE I submarine of WWI
 German Type UE II submarine of WWI